Epileptogenesis is the gradual process by which a typical brain develops epilepsy. Epilepsy is a chronic condition in which seizures occur. These changes to the brain occasionally cause neurons to fire in an abnormal, hypersynchronous manner, known as a seizure.

Epileptogenesis is a chronic disorder. Genetic factors are the most triggering factor. The treatment is difficult to find. There is almost no therapy available for epileptogenesis patients. In epileptogenesis, a normal brain is transformed into an epileptic brain and generates spontaneous seizures. Epileptogenesis is the process by which brain injury leads to chronic epilepsy. Epileptogenesis can be triggered by both acquired as well as genetic factors. Previously, epileptogenesis was considered to be represented by the latent period, but recently, based on clinical observations, epileptogenesis is now considered to extend beyond the latent period. The procedure of epileptogenesis typically happens in three phases: first, the occurrence event, second, a ‘latent’ period and third, chronic conventional epilepsy. In recent studies, it has been finding out that mTOR and REST pathways are responsible for temporal lobe epileptogenesis. The original mechanisms of epileptogenesis are debatable. There is not a singular mechanism that applies to all epilepsy syndromes. It can be brought by an “epilepsy gene”, long-lasting neurodegenerative illnesses, or different kinds of acute brain insults. Brain pathologies that are associated with Epileptogenesis are microgliosis, astrocytosis, neuronal cell death; chronic axonal changes, etc. Epileptogenesis refers to the expansion of tissue that causes repeated unprovoked seizures leading to the development of an epileptic situation. The frequency of seizures and epilepsies is comparatively more throughout the neonatal and infantile periods. Certain conditions, like cell loss due to seizure, and metabolic and genetic changes, lead to epileptogenesis. Epileptogenesis is also the development of epileptic indications in some forms of epilepsy after the preliminary seizures occur. To prevent epilepsy, studies are aimed to identify the important neuronal mechanisms of epileptogenesis in diverse types of epilepsy. Then the abort or reverse of the procedure is denoted as antiepileptogenesis. Antiepileptogenesis can lead to complete prevention which stops the development of epilepsy. It can also prevent partially which delays in the progress of epilepsy or lessens its severity.

Causes
The causes of epilepsy are broadly classified as genetic, structural/metabolic, or unknown. Anything that causes epilepsy causes epileptogenesis, because epileptogenesis is the process of developing epilepsy. Structural causes of epilepsy include neurodegenerative diseases, traumatic brain injury, stroke, brain tumor, infections of the central nervous system, and status epilepticus (a prolonged seizure or a series of seizures occurring in quick succession).

Latent period
After a brain injury occurs, there is frequently a "silent" or "latent period" lasting months or years in which seizures do not occur; Canadian neurosurgeon Wilder Penfield called this time between injury and seizure "a silent period of strange ripening". During this latent period, changes in the physiology of the brain result in the development of epilepsy. This process, during which hyperexcitable neural networks form, is referred to as epileptogenesis. If researchers come to better understand epileptogenesis, the latent period may allow healthcare providers to interfere with the development of epilepsy or to reduce its severity.

Pathophysiology
Changes that occur during epileptogenesis are poorly understood but are thought to include cell death, axonal sprouting, reorganization of neural networks, alterations in the release of neurotransmitters, and neurogenesis. These changes cause neurons to become hyperexcitable and can lead to spontaneous seizures.

Brain regions that are highly sensitive to insults and can cause epileptogenesis include temporal lobe structures such as the hippocampus, the amygdala, and the piriform cortex.

Neural reorganization
In addition to chemical processes, the physical structure of neurons in the brain may be altered.
In acquired epilepsy in both humans and animal models, pyramidal neurons are lost, and new synapses are formed.

Hyperexcitability, a characteristic feature of epileptogenesis in which the likelihood that neural networks will be activated is increased, may be due to loss of inhibitory neurons, such as GABAergic interneurons, that would normally balance out the excitability of other neurons. Neuronal circuits that are epileptic are known for being hyperexcitable and for lacking the normal balance of glutamatergic neurons (those that usually increase excitation) and GABAergic ones (those that decrease it). In addition, the levels of GABA and the sensitivity of GABAA receptors to the neurotransmitter may decrease, resulting in less inhibition.

Another proposed mechanism for epileptogenesis in TBI is that damage to white matter causes hyperexcitability by effectively undercutting the cerebral cortex.

Glutamate receptor activation
It is believed that activation of biochemical receptors on the surfaces of neurons is involved in epileptogenesis; these include the TrkB neurotrophin receptor and both ionotropic glutamate receptors and metabotropic glutamate receptors (those that are directly linked to an ion channel and those that are not, respectively). Each of these types of receptor may, when activated, cause an increase in the concentration of calcium ions (Ca2+) within the area of the cell on which the receptors are located, and this Ca2+ can activate enzymes such as Src and Fyn that may lead to epileptogenesis.

Excessive release of the neurotransmitter glutamate is widely recognized as an important part of epileptogenesis early after a brain injury, including in humans. Excessive release of glutamate results in excitotoxicity, in which neurons are excessively depolarized, intracellular Ca2+ concentrations increase sharply, and cellular damage or death results. Excessive glutamatergic activity is also a feature of neuronal circuits after epilepsy has developed, but glutamate does not appear to play an important role in epileptogenesis during the latent period. Another factor in hyperexcitability may include a decrease in the concentration of Ca2+ outside cells (i.e. in the extracellular space) and a decrease in the activity of ATPase in glial cells.

Blood brain barrier disruption
Blood brain barrier (BBB) disruption occurs in high prevalence following all brain lesions that may cause post injury epilepsy such as stroke, traumatic brain injury, brain infection or brain tumor. BBB disruption was shown to underlay epileptogenesis by several experimental models. Furthermore, it was shown that albumin, the most frequent protein in the serum is the agent that leaks from the blood into the brain parenchyma under BBB disruption conditions and induces epileptogenesis by activation of the transforming growth factor beta receptor on astrocytes. Additional investigation exposed that this process is mediated by a unique inflammatory pattern  and the formation of excitatory synapses.
Pathogenic influence was attributed also to the extravasation of other blood born substances such as hemosiderin or iron. Iron from hemoglobin, a molecule in red blood cells, can lead to the formation of free radicals that damage cell membranes; this process has been linked to epileptogenesis.

Treatment
A major goal of epilepsy research is the identification of therapies to interrupt or reverse epileptogenesis. Studies largely in animal models have suggested a wide variety of possible antiepileptogenic strategies although, to date, no such therapy has been demonstrated to be antiepileptogenic in clinical trials. Some anticonvulsant drugs, including levetiracetam and ethosuximide have shown promising activity in animal models. Other promising strategies are inhibition of interleukin 1β signaling by drugs such as VX-765; modulation of sphingosine 1-phosphate signaling by drugs such as fingolimod; activation of the mammalian target of rapamycin (mTOR) by drugs such as rapamycin; the hormone erythropoietin; and, paradoxically, drugs such as the α2 adrenergic receptor antagonist atipamezole and the CB1 cannabinoid antagonist SR141716A (rimonabant) with proexcitatory activity.
The discovery of the role played by TGF-beta activation in epileptogenesis raised the hypothesis that blocking this signaling may prevent epileptogenesis. Losartan, a commonly used drug for the treatment of hypertension was shown to prevent epilepsy and facilitate BBB healing in animal models. Testing the potential of antiepileptogenic agents (e.g. losartan) or BBB healing drugs necessitates biomarkers for patients selection and treatment-followup. BBB disruption imaging was shown capacity in animal model to serve as a biomarker of epileptogenesis  and specific EEG patterns were also shown to predict epilepsy in several models.

History
Throughout most of history for which written records exist on the subject, it was probably generally believed that epilepsy came about through a supernatural process. Even within the medical profession, it was not until the 18th century that ideas of epileptogenesis as a supernatural phenomenon were abandoned. However, biological explanations have also long existed, and sometimes explanations contained both biological and supernatural elements.

Research
Epileptogenesis that occurs in human brains has been modeled in a variety of animal models and cell culture models. Epileptogenesis is poorly understood, and increasing understanding of the process may aid researchers in preventing seizures, diagnosing epilepsy, and developing treatments to prevent it.

See also
 Kindling model
 Post-traumatic epilepsy
 Post-traumatic seizure

References

Epilepsy
Neurotrauma